Against the Innocent is a 1989 Australian film about terrorism directed by Daryl Dellora.

References

External links
Against the Innocent at Screen Australia
Against the Innocent at IMDb
Against the Innocent at Oz Movies

1989 films
Australian drama films
Films about terrorism
1980s English-language films
1980s Australian films